The 2009 FIFA Confederations Cup was the eighth Confederations Cup, and was held in South Africa from 14 June to 28 June 2009, as a prelude to the 2010 FIFA World Cup. The draw was held on 22 November 2008 at the Sandton Convention Centre in Johannesburg. The opening match was played at Ellis Park Stadium in Johannesburg. The tournament was won by Brazil, who retained the trophy they won in 2005 by defeating the United States 3–2 in the final.

Qualified teams

Draw
The draw for the competition was held on 22 November 2008 at the Sandton Convention Centre in Johannesburg. Each team was represented in the draw by its competitor in the Miss World 2008 competition, except for Iraq, which was represented by Miss World 2007, Zhang Zilin, from China. The teams were divided into two pots:
 Pot A: South Africa (automatically placed as Team A1), Brazil, Italy, Spain
 Pot B: Egypt, Iraq, New Zealand, United States

Teams from the same confederation were not drawn into the same group, therefore Egypt was drawn into Group B. Also as result, Italy and Spain were drawn into different groups.

Match ball

The official match ball for the 2009 FIFA Confederations Cup was the Adidas Kopanya. The name means "bring (or join) together" in Southern Sesotho, one of the 11 official languages of South Africa. The panel configuration of the ball is the same as that of the Teamgeist and Europass balls that came before it. The ball is white, accentuated with bold black lines and detailed with typical Ndebele designs in red, yellow, green and blue.

Venues
Four cities served as the venues for the 2009 FIFA Confederations Cup. All four venues were also used for the 2010 FIFA World Cup.

Originally, Nelson Mandela Bay Stadium in Port Elizabeth was also chosen as a venue. On 8 July 2008, however, Port Elizabeth withdrew as a host city because its stadium was deemed unlikely to meet the 30 March 2009 deadline for completion. The Nelson Mandela Bay stadium was subsequently completed before the Confederations Cup and was opened on 7 June 2009. It acted as a venue for the 2009 British & Irish Lions tour to South Africa on 16 June. All of these stadia hosted matches during the Lions tour, but a minimum of nine days was allowed for pitch recovery between a rugby match and a Confederations Cup match.

Match officials
The referees were announced on 5 May. Two referee teams (led by Carlos Batres and Carlos Amarilla respectively) withdrew due to injuries. Replacements from the same confederation, led by Benito Archundia and Pablo Pozo, were selected.

Squads

Group stage
Tie-breaking criteria
The ranking of each team in each group was determined as follows:

 Greatest number of points obtained in all group matches;
 Goal difference in all group matches;
 Greatest number of goals scored in all group matches.

Had two or more teams been equal on the basis of the above three criteria, their rankings would have been determined as follows:

 Greatest number of points obtained in the group matches between the teams concerned;
 Goal difference resulting from the group matches between the teams concerned;
 Greater number of goals scored in all group matches between the teams concerned;
 Drawing of lots by the FIFA Organising Committee.

Group A

Group B

Knockout stage

Semi-finals

Match for third place

Final

Awards

Statistics

Goalscorers
Luís Fabiano received the Golden Shoe award for scoring five goals. In total, 44 goals were scored by 27 different players, with only one of them credited as own goal.

5 goals
 Luís Fabiano

3 goals

 Fernando Torres
 David Villa
 Clint Dempsey

2 goals

 Kaká
 Mohamed Zidan
 Katlego Mphela
 Bernard Parker
 Giuseppe Rossi
 Dani Güiza
 Landon Donovan

1 goal

 Dani Alves
 Felipe Melo
 Juan
 Lúcio
 Maicon
 Robinho
 Homos
 Mohamed Shawky
 Daniele De Rossi
 Xabi Alonso
 Cesc Fàbregas
 Fernando Llorente
 Jozy Altidore
 Michael Bradley
 Charlie Davies

Own goal
 Andrea Dossena (against Brazil)

Tournament ranking

See also
 2010 FIFA World Cup

References

External links

FIFA Confederations Cup South Africa 2009, FIFA.com
2009 FIFA Confederations Cup Official Site (Archived)
FIFA Technical Report

 
2009
2009
COn
2009 in association football
June 2009 sports events in Africa